The Phantom of the Forest is a 1926 American silent Western film, also classified as a Northern. It is directed by Henry McCarty and stars Thunder the Dog, Betty Francisco and Eddie Phillips. Produced by the independent Gotham Pictures, location shooting took place around the Redwood Forest in Santa Cruz County, California. The film was designed as a vehicle for Thunder, an Alsatian who was featured in several films during the 1920s. It was released in Great Britain the same year by Stoll Pictures.

Plot
As described in a film magazine review, while a pup, Thunder runs wild in the forest, but becomes attached to Helen Taylor, who owns land that has oil prospects and is mortgaged. Certain land speculators plot to seize the property, but are prevented by Frank Wallace who pays the interest. The plotters set fire to the forest. Helen and Frank are trapped, and then escape by a hair's breadth. Thnder fights his way through the flames and rescues a sick child. At the end, Frank and Helen are united.

Cast
 Thunder the Dog as Thunder 
 Betty Francisco as Helen Taylor
 Eddie Phillips as Frank Wallace
 Jim Mason as Walt Mingin 
 Frank Foster Davis as Joe Deering
 Irene Hunt as Mrs. Deering
 Rhody Hathaway as John Wallace
 White Fawn the Dog as White Fawn

References

Bibliography
 Connelly, Robert B. The Silents: Silent Feature Films, 1910-36, Volume 40, Issue 2. December Press, 1998.
 Munden, Kenneth White. The American Film Institute Catalog of Motion Pictures Produced in the United States, Part 1. University of California Press, 1997.

External links

 

1926 films
1926 Western (genre) films
Silent American Western (genre) films
American black-and-white films
American silent feature films
1920s English-language films
Films directed by Henry McCarty
Gotham Pictures films
Northern (genre) films
1920s American films